Ramírez is a Spanish-language patronymic surname of Germanic origin, meaning "son of Ramiro". Its correct spelling in Spanish is with an acute accent on the i, which is often omitted in English writing. It is the 28th most common surname in Spain. It is also the 42nd most common surname in the U.S. and the 9th most common in Mexico.

Geographical distribution
As of 2014, 40.1% of all known bearers of the surname Ramírez were residents of Mexico (frequency 1:62), 10.2% of Colombia (1:95), 8.3% of the United States (1:874), 5.4% of Venezuela (1:112), 5.3% of Guatemala (1:61), 4.3% of Peru (1:149), 3.6% of Argentina (1:239), 2.8% of Spain (1:336), 2.7% of the Philippines (1:768), 2.6% of the Dominican Republic (1:79), 2.1% of Chile (1:169), 2.0% of El Salvador (1:65), 1.9% of Cuba (1:123), 1.7% of Honduras (1:105), 1.7% of Paraguay (1:88), 1.3% of Costa Rica (1:72) and 1.2% of Ecuador (1:273).

In Spain, the frequency of the surname was higher than average (1:336) in the following regions:
 1. Canary Islands (1:149)
 2. Andalusia (1:179)
 3. La Rioja (1:264)
 4. Castilla–La Mancha (1:276)
 5. Ceuta (1:295)
 6. Community of Madrid (1:336)

In Guatemala, the frequency of the surname was higher than average (1:61) in the following departments:
 1. Chiquimula (1:15)
 2. San Marcos (1:22)
 3. Zacapa (1:26)
 4. Izabal (1:35)
 5. Esquintla (1:40)
 6. El Progreso (1:40)
 7. Quetzaltenango (1:43)
 8. Jutiapa (1:50)
 9. Retalhuleu (1:51)
 10. Santa Rosa (1:54)
 11. Petén (1:58)

In Mexico, the frequency of the surname was higher than national average (1:62) in the following states:
 1. Guanajuato (1:32)
 2. Oaxaca (1:43)
 3. Querétaro (1:49)
 4. Colima (1:54)
 5. Jalisco (1:55)
 6. Hidalgo (1:56)
 7. Coahuila (1:58)
 8. State of Mexico (1:60)
 9. Mexico City (1:60)
 10. Aguascalientes (1:61)

People 
 Agustín Ramírez (1952–2022), Mexican singer-songwriter of the group Los Caminantes
 Ainissa Ramirez (born 1969), American materials scientist and science communicator
 Albertina Ramírez (1898–1979), Nicaraguan Roman Catholic mystic and religious leader
 Alex Ramírez (born 1974), left fielder for the Yokohama DeNA BayStars
 Alexei Ramírez (born 1981), Cuban baseball player
 Ana María Ramírez (born 1948), Peruvian volleyball player
 Ángel de Saavedra y Ramírez de Baquedano, 3rd Duke of Rivas (1791–1865), Spanish poet and politician
 Aramis Ramírez (born 1978), third-baseman for the Pittsburgh Pirates
 Ariel Ramírez (1921–2010), Argentinian composer and pianist
 Carlos Ramírez (born 1991), Dominican baseball player
 Carlos Ramírez Suárez (1902–1978), Spanish lawyer and writer
 Carlos Betances Ramírez (1910–2001), Puerto Rican Army Colonel
 Chamaco Ramirez (1941–1983), Puerto Rican salsa singer and composer
 Cierra Ramirez (born 1995), American actress
 Cuauhtémoc Sandoval Ramírez (1950–2012), Mexican politician
 Dania Ramírez (born 1979), Dominican actress
 Daniel Ramírez Romero (born 1995), Spanish singer
 Danny Ramirez (born 1992), American actor
 Danny Ramirez (baseball), American baseball player and coach
 Diana Velázquez Ramírez (born 1970), Mexican politician
 Domonique Ramírez (born 1992), Texas model and beauty queen 
 Dubán Ramírez (born 1965), Colombian road cyclist
 Édgar Ramirez Arellano (born 1987), Venezuelan actor
 Edwar Ramírez (born 1981), relief pitcher for the New York Yankees
 Efren Ramírez (born 1973), American actor
 Erasmo Ramirez (left-handed pitcher) (born 1976), American baseball player
 Erasmo Ramírez (right-handed pitcher) (born 1990), Nicaraguan baseball player
 Erwin Ramírez (born 1971), Ecuadorian football player
 Fernando Ramírez de Haro, 16th Count of Bornos (born 1949)
 Fernando Ramírez de Haro, 10th Marquis of Villanueva del Duero (born 1976)
 García Ramírez of Navarre (1112–1150), of the Jiménez dynasty
 Gastón Ramírez (born 1990), Uruguayan football player
 Gloria Ramirez (1963–1994), American the toxic lady
 Hanley Ramírez (born 1983), first baseman for the Boston Red Sox
 Harold Ramírez (born 1994), Colombian baseball player
 Héctor Fabián Ramírez (born 1982), Colombian footballer
 Hernán Ramírez Necochea (1917–1979), Chilean historian
 Ilich Ramírez Sánchez (born 1949; also known as Carlos the Jackal), Venezuelan terrorist
 Jaime Patricio Ramírez (born 1967), Chilean football player
 Jennifer Ramírez Rivero (1978–2018), Venezuelan model and businesswoman
 Jesús Emilio Ramírez (1904–1981), Colombian geophysicist
 José Ramírez (1858–1923), Spanish luthier and founder of Ramírez Guitars
 José Ramírez III (1922–1995), grandson of José Ramírez (see above) and luthier of international renown 
 José Fernando Ramírez (1804–1871), Mexican historian
 José Luis Ramírez (born 1958), Mexican lightweight boxer
 Juan Andrés Ramírez (born 1946), Uruguayan lawyer and politician
 Juan Diego Ramírez (born 1971), Colombian road cyclist
 Juan Sánchez Ramírez (1762–1811), Dominican Army General and Governor of the Dominican Republic 
 Juana Ramírez (1790–1856), Venezuelan independence fighter
 Laureano Ramírez (born 1965), Dominican flyweight boxer
 Luis Ramírez de Lucena, 16th-century Spanish chess grandmaster
 Manny Ramírez (born 1972), former MLB left fielder
 Maria Teresa Ramírez (born 1954), Mexican freestyle swimmer
 Mario Ramírez Treviño (born 1962), Mexican drug lord
 Martín Ramírez (1895–1963), self-taught 20th-century artist
 Michael Ramirez (born 1961), American editorial cartoonist
 Noé Ramirez (born 1989), American baseball player
 Pablo Ramírez (born 1964), Spanish-language sports commentator
 Paul Henry Ramirez (born 1963), American contemporary painter
 Pedro Pablo Ramírez (1884–1962), 27th President of Argentina
 Pilar Ramírez (born 1964), Mexican synchronized swimmer
 Pocholo Ramírez (de Arellano) (1932–2009), Filipino car racer and TV host
 Ramón Ramírez (born 1969), Mexican footballer
 Raúl Ramírez (born 1953), Mexican tennis player
 Richard Ramirez (1960–2013), American serial killer known as "the Night Stalker" or "the Valley Intruder"
 Richard Ramirez (musician) (born 1970), noise musician
 Sancho Ramírez, King of Aragon (1042–1094)
 Sancho Ramírez, Count of Ribagorza (died 1117)
 Sara Ramirez (born 1975), Mexican actress and singer
 Sergio Ramírez (born 1942), Vice-President of Nicaragua and writer
 Sue Ramirez (born 1996), Filipino actress and singer
 Twiggy Ramirez (born 1971), pseudonym of Jeordie White, bass guitarist for the band Marilyn Manson
 Victor Ramirez (disambiguation), several people
 Yohan Ramírez (born 1995), Dominican baseball player

Characters
 Cruz Ramirez from Cars 3
 Emily Ramirez from Close Enough
 James Ramirez from Call of Duty: Modern Warfare 2
 Jeremy Ramirez from The Adventures of Barry Ween, Boy Genius
 Juan Sánchez-Villalobos Ramírez (Sean Connery's character in the Highlander films)
 Ophelia Ramírez from The Life and Times of Juniper Lee
 Ruby Ramirez from Rusty Rivets
 Soos Ramirez from Gravity Falls

References

 INEbase / Demography and population

Patronymic surnames
Spanish-language surnames
Surnames of Spanish origin
Surnames of Honduran origin
Surnames of Salvadoran origin
Surnames of Guatemalan origin
Surnames of Colombian origin